NVC community H6 (Erica vagans - Ulex europaeus heath) is one of the heath communities in the British National Vegetation Classification system. It is one of five communities categorised as lowland dry heaths.

It has a very localised distribution in southern England. There are four subcommunities.



Community composition

The following constant species are found in this community:
 Brown Bent (Agrostis vinealis)
 Glaucous Sedge (Carex flacca)
 Bell Heather (Erica cinerea)
 Cornish Heath (Erica vagans)
 Meadowsweet (Filipendula ulmaria)
 Common Gorse (Ulex europaeus)
 Western Gorse (Ulex gallii)
 Common Dog-violet (Viola riviniana)

A number of rare species are associated with the community: Bristle Bent (Agrostis curtisii), Chives (Allium schoenoprasum), Cornish Heath (Erica vagans), Dwarf Rush (Juncus capitatus), Spring Squill (Scilla verna) and Twin-headed Clover (Trifolium bocconei).

Distribution
This community is confined to The Lizard peninsula in Cornwall.

Subcommunities
There are four subcommunities:
 the so-called typical subcommunity
 the Festuca ovina subcommunity
 the Agrostis curtisii subcommunity
 the Molinia caerulea subcommunity

References

 Rodwell, J. S. (1991) British Plant Communities Volume 2 - Mires and heaths  (hardback),  (paperback)

H06
 
Lizard Peninsula